Eva Peštová (born 4 November 1952) is a former ice dancer who represented Czechoslovakia. Together with Jiří Pokorný she competed at the 1976 Winter Olympics and finished in 11th place. Their best ISU Championship placement was eighth at the 1976 World Championships.

Competitive highlights 
(with Pokorný)

References

1952 births
Living people
Czech female ice dancers
Czechoslovak female ice dancers
Olympic figure skaters of Czechoslovakia
Figure skaters at the 1976 Winter Olympics
Figure skaters from Prague